Chenjiahe Town is an urban town in Sangzhi County, Zhangjiajie, Hunan Province, China.

Administrative division
The town is divided into 20 villages and 2 communities, the following areas: Qiaotou Community, Huangmutan Community, Caijiaping Village, Maota Village, Zhoujiawan Village, Chenjiawan Village, Yuanjiaping Village, Liujiawan Village, Pengjiata Village, Xinjie Village, Erdongping Village, Poufuxi Village, Tangjiaping Village, Chenjiahe Village, Ganxi Village, Longtangou Village, Changwan Village, Wujiawan Village, Cangguanyu Village, Banxi Village, Xiaojiaping Village, and Sanlanzi Village (桥头社区、黄木潭社区、蔡家坪村、毛塔村、周家弯村、陈家湾村、袁家坪村、刘家湾村、彭家塔村、新街村、二洞坪村、剖腹溪村、唐家坪村、陈家河村、干溪村、龙潭沟村、厂湾村、吴家湾村、苍关峪村、半溪村、肖家坪村、三兰子村).

References

External links

 
Divisions of Sangzhi County